Noël Carroll (born 1947) is an American philosopher considered to be one of the leading figures in contemporary philosophy of art. Although Carroll is best known for his work in the philosophy of film (he is a proponent of cognitive film theory), he has also published journalism, works on philosophy of art generally, theory of media, and also philosophy of history. As of 2012, he is a distinguished professor of philosophy at the CUNY Graduate Center.

Education
B.A., Philosophy, Hofstra University, 1969
M.A., Philosophy, University of Pittsburgh, 1970
M.A., Cinema Studies, New York University, 1974
M.A., Philosophy, University of Illinois Chicago, 1976
Ph.D., Cinema Studies, New York University, 1976 (thesis title: "An In-Depth Analysis of Buster Keaton's The General")
Ph.D., Philosophy, University of Illinois Chicago, 1983

Career
Carroll holds PhDs in both cinema studies and philosophy. From 1972–1988, he worked as a journalist covering film, theater, performance, and fine art for publications such as the Chicago Reader, Artforum, In These Times, Dance Magazine, SoHo Weekly News and The Village Voice. Many of these early articles have been collected in his 2011 book Living in an Artworld. He has also written five documentaries.

Perhaps his most popular and influential book is The Philosophy of Horror, or, Paradoxes of the Heart (1990), an examination of the aesthetics of horror fiction (in novels, stories, radio and film). As noted in the book's introduction, Carroll wrote Paradoxes of the Heart in part to convince his parents that his lifelong fascination with horror fiction was not a waste of time. Another important book by Carroll is Mystifying Movies (1988), a critique of the ideas of psychoanalyst Jacques Lacan, Marxist philosopher Louis Althusser and the semiotics of Roland Barthes, which has been credited with inspiring a shift away from what Carroll describes as the "psycho-semiotic Marxism" that had dominated film studies and film theory in American universities since the 1970s.

Carroll was the recipient of a Guggenheim Fellowship in 2002 for his research in philosophy of dance.

He was named sixth-most influential philosopher of art since 1945 by the Philosophical Gourmet Report.

Positions 
Monroe C. Beardsley Professor of Philosophy at the University of Wisconsin–Madison
Andrew W. Mellon Professor of the Humanities at Temple University
Distinguished Professor of Philosophy at the CUNY Graduate Center
Former president of the American Society for Aesthetics

Works 
Carroll is the author of more than one hundred articles and other works:

Books

Monographs
Philosophical Problems of Classical Film Theory, Princeton, Princeton University Press, 1988.
Mystifying Movies: Fads and Fallacies in Contemporary Film Theory, New York, Columbia University Press, 1988.
The Philosophy of Horror, or Paradoxes of the Heart, New York, Routledge, 1990.
Theorizing The Moving Image, Cambridge, Cambridge University Press, 1996.
A Philosophy of Mass Art, New York, Oxford University Press, 1998.
Interpreting The Moving Image, Cambridge, Cambridge University Press, 1998.
Philosophy of Art: A Contemporary Introduction, New York, Routledge, 1999.
Beyond Aesthetics: Philosophical Essays, Cambridge, Cambridge University Press, 2001.
Engaging The Moving Image, New Haven, Yale University Press, 2003.
Comedy Incarnate: Buster Keaton, Physical Humor and Bodily Coping, Malden, Blackwell Publishing, 2007.
The Philosophy of Motion Pictures, Malden, Blackwell Publishing, 2008.
On Criticism, London, Routledge, 2009.
Art in Three Dimensions, Oxford, Oxford University Press, 2010.
Narrative, Emotion, and Insight, with John Gibson, Penn State University Press, 2011.
Living in an Artworld: Reviews and Essays on Dance, Performance, Theater, and the Fine Arts in the 1970s and 1980s, Louisville, KY: Chicago Spectrum Press, 2012.
Humour: A Very Short Introduction, Oxford, Oxford University Press, 2014.
Routledge Companion to Philosophy of Literature, with John Gibson, Routledge, 2016.
Arthur Danto’s Philosophy of Art: Essays, Boston, Brill, 2021.
Classics in the Philosophy of Art, Oxford, Oxford University Press, in preparation.

Edited volumes
Post-Theory: Reconstructing Film Studies (edited with David Bordwell), Madison, University of Wisconsin Press, 1996.
Theories of Art Today, Madison, University of Wisconsin Press, 2000.
Philosophy of Film and Motion Pictures (edited with Jinhee Choi), Malden, Blackwell Publishing, 2006.
Philosophy in the Twilight Zone (edited with Lester Hunt), Oxford, Blackwell, 2009.
The Poetics, Aesthetics and Philosophy of Narrative (edited with an introduction by Noël Carroll), Oxford, Blackwell, 2009.

Selected articles
Hume's Standard of Taste, The Journal of Aesthetics and Art Criticism, Vol. 43, No. 2 (Winter, 1984), pp.181-194

See also
 American philosophy
 List of American philosophers

References

Sources 
 Mario Slugan, Noël Carroll and Film: A Philosophy of Art and Popular Culture. Bloomsbury, 2019.

External links 
 Phil Papers
 Carroll's archive on the CUNY Philosophy Commons
 

1947 births
20th-century American educators
20th-century American essayists
20th-century American historians
20th-century American journalists
20th-century American male writers
20th-century American philosophers
20th-century educational theorists
21st-century American educators
21st-century American essayists
21st-century American historians
21st-century American journalists
21st-century American male writers
21st-century American philosophers
21st-century educational theorists
American art critics
American dance critics
American educational theorists
American ethicists
American film critics
American film historians
American journalists
American literary theorists
American male essayists
American male non-fiction writers
American mass media scholars
American music theorists
American philosophy academics
American theater critics
Analytic philosophers
Communication theorists
Critics of postmodernism
Graduate Center, CUNY faculty
Film theorists
Humor researchers
Living people
Mass media theorists
Media critics
Metaphor theorists
Phenomenologists
Philosophers of art
Philosophers of culture
Philosophers of education
Philosophers of history
Philosophers of literature
Philosophers of social science
Philosophy writers
Social philosophers
Trope theorists
Theorists on Western civilization